Niceforonia nana is a species of frog in the family Strabomantidae. It is endemic to the Cordillera Oriental, Colombia, and found at  asl.

This rare frog inhabits páramo grassland and montane forest, as well as secondary forest. It is potentially threatened by habitat loss.

References

nana
Amphibians of the Andes
Amphibians of Colombia
Endemic fauna of Colombia
Páramo fauna
Taxa named by Doris Mable Cochran
Taxonomy articles created by Polbot
Amphibians described in 1963